Pack Monadnock or Pack Monadnock Mountain , is the highest peak of the Wapack Range of mountains and the highest point in Hillsborough County, New Hampshire. The mountain, a monadnock, is located in south-central New Hampshire within the towns of Peterborough and Temple. The  Wapack Trail and a number of shorter trails traverse the mountain. A firetower and ledges on the summit offer long views north to the White Mountains, west to Mount Monadnock, and south into Massachusetts. North Pack Monadnock Mountain is located directly to the north along the Wapack ridgeline; Temple Mountain to the south.

Much of the mountain is located within Miller State Park. A seasonal automobile road ascends from the south to a picnic area at the summit. The summit also has a staffed air-pollution monitoring station.

The east side of the mountain drains into the Souhegan River watershed, thence into the Merrimack River and Atlantic Ocean; the west side drains into the Contoocook River, thence into the Merrimack River.

The mountain is the home of the Pack Monadnock Raptor Migration Observatory, where birdwatchers from around the region gather for the annual hawk migration.  During the peak migration season in September, birdwatchers search the sky for kettles of hundreds of hawks swarming above rising thermals as they migrate south.

The mountain's summit at Peterborough is also home to the transmitter of two Manchester-market radio stations: NOAA Weather Radio station WNG575 and 92.1 WDER-FM, which airs a Christian talk and preaching format.

Etymology 

According to local tradition, the word "pack" is a Native American word for "little" and "monadnock" is used to describe an isolated mountain summit; thus "Little Monadnock" refers to its relationship to the higher Mount Monadnock,  to the west.

References

 Southern New Hampshire Trail Guide (1999). Boston: The Appalachian Mountain Club.

External links
 Miller State Park official website
 Friends of the Wapack
 Pack Monadnock Raptor Migration Observatory

Mountains of Hillsborough County, New Hampshire
Mountains of New Hampshire
Raptor migration sites
Peterborough, New Hampshire
Temple, New Hampshire
New Hampshire placenames of Native American origin